Microphysogobio jeoni is a species of cyprinid fish endemic to the Korean peninsula.

Named in honor of Sang-Rin Jeon, professor at Sangmyong University (Seoul, Korea), for his contributions to the study of ichthyology in Korea.

References

Microphysogobio
Taxa named by Ik-Soo Kim
Fish described in 1999